Linn is a city in Washington County, Kansas, United States.  As of the 2020 census, the population of the city was 387.

History
Linn was founded in 1877. It was named for Lewis F. Linn, a U.S. Senator from Missouri.

The first post office in Linn was established in January 1878.

Geography
Linn is located at  (39.680240, -97.085422).

Demographics

2010 census
As of the census of 2010, there were 410 people, 152 households, and 97 families residing in the city. The racial makeup of the city was 94.1% White, 1.2% African American, 0.7% Native American, 2.9% from other races, and 1.0% from two or more races. Hispanic or Latino of any race were 12.4% of the population.

There were 152 households, of which 28.9% had children under the age of 18 living with them, 55.9% were married couples living together, 6.6% had a female householder with no husband present, 1.3% had a male householder with no wife present, and 36.2% were non-families. 34.2% of all households were made up of individuals, and 19% had someone living alone who was 65 years of age or older. The average household size was 2.30 and the average family size was 2.98.

The median age in the city was 48.1 years. 21.5% of residents were under the age of 18; 5.6% were between the ages of 18 and 24; 18.6% were from 25 to 44; 19.7% were from 45 to 64; and 34.6% were 65 years of age or older. The gender makeup of the city was 45.6% male and 54.4% female.

2000 census
As of the census of 2000, there were 425 people, 164 households, and 102 families residing in the city. The racial makeup of the city was 100.00% White. Hispanic or Latino of any race were 0.47% of the population.

There were 164 households, out of which 22.6% had children under the age of 18 living with them, 57.9% were married couples living together, 4.3% had a female householder with no husband present, and 37.2% were non-families. 35.4% of all households were made up of individuals, and 22.0% had someone living alone who was 65 years of age or older. The average household size was 2.09 and the average family size was 2.71.

In the city, the population was spread out, with 17.9% under the age of 18, 2.6% from 18 to 24, 20.2% from 25 to 44, 16.0% from 45 to 64, and 43.3% who were 65 years of age or older. The median age was 59 years. For every 100 females, there were 78.6 males. For every 100 females age 18 and over, there were 71.1 males.

The median income for a household in the city was $27,619, and the median income for a family was $35,909. Males had a median income of $24,167 versus $18,125 for females. The per capita income for the city was $17,624. About 4.5% of families and 7.8% of the population were below the poverty line, including 5.6% of those under age 18 and 15.6% of those age 65 or over.

References

Further reading

External links
 Linn - Directory of Public Officials
 USD 223, local school district
 Linn city map, KDOT

Cities in Kansas
Cities in Washington County, Kansas